is a Japanese professional shogi player, ranked 7-dan.

Early life
An'yōji was born in Uji, Kyoto Prefecture on August 30, 1974. In 1988, he finished runner up in the 42nd  as  second-grade junior high school student, and then entered the Japan Shogi Association's apprentice school at the rank of 6-kyū under the guidance of shogi professional  later that year. He was promoted to 1-dan in 1994 and obtained full professional status and the rank of 4-dan in October 1999 after finishing 2nd in the 25th 3-dan League with a record of 13 wins and 5 losses.

Promotion history
An'yōji's promotion history is as follows:

 6-kyū: 1998
 1-dan: 1994
 4-dan: October 1, 1999
 5-dan: November 15, 2005
 6-dan: February 10, 2009
 7-dan: January 26, 2021

References

External links
ShogiHub: Professional Player Info · Annyouji, Takanori [sic]

Japanese shogi players
Living people
Professional shogi players
Professional shogi players from Kyoto Prefecture
1974 births